Pierre-Hugues Herbert and Nicolas Renavand were the defending champions, but lost in the first round.
Laurynas Grigelis and Uladzimir Ignatik won the title, defeating Dustin Brown and Jonathan Marray 4–6, 7–6(11–9), [10–0] in the final.

Seeds

Draw

Draw

References
 Main Draw

Challenger DCNS de Cherbourg - Doubles
2012 Doubles